Shakespeare Like A Street Dog (Bulgarian: Шекспир като улично куче) is a 2022 Bulgarian drama film written and directed by Valeri Yordanov. Starring Vladislav Stoimenov, Zahari Baharov, Vasil Iliev and Eleonora Ivanova. The film was named on the shortlist for Bulgarian's entry for the Academy Award for Best International Feature Film at the 95th Academy Awards, but it was not selected. It was considered again when Mother was disqualified, however, it was not selected.

Synopsis 
What happens to a boy who has 2 great talents? One is the theater and the other is street fighting. He is faced with the dilemma of which of them to use to save the life of his closest person. There are only two options - to box in illegal matches for money or to win a reality TV show where he recites Shakespeare.

Cast 

 Vladislav Stoimenov
 Zahari Baharov
 Vasil Iliev
 Doroteya Toleva
 Nikolay Nikolaev
 Nazam Karakurt
 Eleonora Ivanova
 Yavor Gadzhev

Release 
The film had its international premiere on September 26, 2022, at the Golden Rose Film Festival. It was commercially released on February 3, 2023, in Bulgarian cinemas.

Awards

References

External links 

 

2022 films
2022 drama films
Bulgarian drama films
2020s Bulgarian-language films
Films set in Bulgaria
Films shot in Bulgaria
Films about teenagers
Films about poverty
Films about literature